The  franchise has had various soundtracks, remix albums and compilations released around it. The franchise has sold more than 9million albums and singles.

Shirō Sagisu composed most of the music for Neon Genesis Evangelion and for the original TV show's three OST albums. He received the 1997 Kobe Animation award for "Best Music Score". King Records and their label Starchild (specializing in music, animation and film) distributed most of the albums, singles and box sets. For the anime series, Yoko Takahashi performed the song "A Cruel Angel's Thesis" which was used as the opening theme song for the series. The song "Fly Me to the Moon" originally by Bart Howard was performed by various voice actors from the anime series and these versions of the song were used as the ending theme song for the series. Theme songs were also granted for the films in the franchise Evangelion: Death and Rebirth, its follow-up The End of Evangelion and four installments of the Rebuild of Evangelion film series.

Theme songs

"A Cruel Angel's Thesis"

 is the theme song used in the anime performed by Yoko Takahashi. It was used as the opening to the series, and two instrumental versions of it were played in the finale episode titled "Take care of yourself." These versions are named "The Heady Feeling of Freedom" and "Good, or Don't Be", scored for violin, piano, and guitar. The single was released on October 25, 1995 with the part number KIDA-116. It also reached a peak rank 17 in the Oricon album database, in which it appeared 61 times in total.

"Fly Me to the Moon"

"Fly Me to the Moon" is one of the theme songs in the Neon Genesis Evangelion series. In the anime it was used as the ending theme. Various artists including voice actors from the franchise have performed the song. It has mainly been performed by Claire Littley, Yoko Takahashi, Megumi Hayashibara, Yuko Miyamura, Aki, and Aya. Hikaru Utada also performed their version of "Fly Me to the Moon" for the film Evangelion: 1.0 You Are (Not) Alone.

Version

"Tamashii no Refrain"
 was the theme song used for the first film in the Neon Genesis Evangelion franchise, Evangelion: Death and Rebirth. It was performed by Yoko Takahashi and released as a single on February 21, 1997. Takahashi later remixed the song as "Soul's Refrain (Erato Version)" for her 1997 album Li-La.

"Thanatos -If I Can't Be Yours-"
"Thanatos -If I Can't Be Yours-" (stylized "THANATOS-IF I CAN'T BE YOURS-" in Japan) was the theme song used in the continuation and completion of the previous films Death and Rebirth, The End of Evangelion. LOREN & MASH performed the song in the original and the 9 Years After mix version, which was composed by Shirō Sagisu and played in the credits that appear between episodes 25' and 26'. Loren and Mash also sang various songs in Neon Genesis Evangelion. Other songs by Loren include the "Komm, süsser Tod" Tumbling Down Remix among other songs on Evangelion: Vox. Other songs by Mash include various songs on Evangelion: Vox, including "X-plicit" and "Armageddon", a rap version of Pachelbel's Canon in D, complete with string quartet.

"Komm, süsser Tod"
"Komm, süsser Tod" (German, also rendered as "Komm, süßer Tod"; ; Come, Sweet Death in English; 甘き死よ、来たれ in Japanese) is a song, performed by Arianne Cleopatra Schreiber (who released two new versions in March 2012), with piano, Hammond organ, and various string arrangements orchestrated by Shirō Sagisu. It is sung in English and used in the 1997 animated film The End of Evangelion during the beginning of the Third Impact.

Hideaki Anno wrote both the original Japanese lyrics for this song and the unused "Everything You've Ever Dreamed", which was also sung by Arianne and composed by Shirō Sagisu (it later appeared on the Refrain of Evangelion album). The songs were then adapted into English by Mike Wyzgowski and performed by Arianne. The song's melody has been compared to that of "Hey Jude" by The Beatles.

An instrumental version of this song is used during the Evangelion ending in Super Robot Wars Alpha 3. Notably, the song plays during a far more optimistic version of the events of End of Evangelion, with Shinji and Asuka rescuing Rei and averting the Human Instrumentality Project.

"Beautiful World"

"Beautiful World" is Hikaru Utada's 19th Japanese single and their 26th single overall. The single was released on 29 August 2007. "Beautiful World" was used as the theme song for the first installment of the Rebuild of Evangelion series of films, Evangelion: 1.0 You Are (Not) Alone. It peak ranked 2nd in the Oricon singles charts and remained there for 26 weeks.

"Beautiful World (Planitb Acoustica Mix)" is a remix of "Beautiful World" by Hikaru Utada. In May 2009, Hikaru Utada was announced to return to the series and provide the theme song for the second film in the Rebuild of Evangelion series, Evangelion: 2.0 You Can (Not) Advance. "Beautiful World" was re-released in 2009 as "Beautiful World: Planitb Acoustica Mix" for the release of the movie after previously being released to be used as the theme song for the first film.

"Sakura Nagashi"

 is Hikaru Utada's 26th Japanese single and their 34th single overall, written in collaboration with Paul Carter. The single was released on November 17, 2012. "Sakura Nagashi" was used as the theme song for the third of the Rebuild of Evangelion series of films, Evangelion: 3.0 You Can (Not) Redo. It peaked at number 1 on the Billboard Japan Weekly Charts.

"One Last Kiss"

"One Last Kiss" is Hikaru Utada's first and thus far only EP. It was released in the US on March 9, 2021. "One Last Kiss" was used as the theme song for the fourth of the Rebuild of Evangelion series of films, Evangelion: 3.0+1.0 Thrice Upon a Time. It peaked at number 1 on the iTunes Japan Weekly Charts.

Soundtrack albums

Neon Genesis Evangelion
Neon Genesis Evangelion is the first soundtrack album for the anime series. It was produced by Hideaki Anno and released under the King Record label Starchild with catalog number KICA-286 on December 6, 1995. It was recorded on November 22, 1995,
and peaked at number 12 on the Oricon albums chart, staying in the chart for 22 weeks. The album was re-released on DVD-Audio with catalog number KIAW-21 on December 22, 2004. The album was released in the US by Geneon Entertainment on January 1, 2004.

Track #1 is the director-edited version of the opening theme "A Cruel Angel's Thesis" performed by Yoko Takahashi with lyrics by Neko Oikawa. Track #2 and #23 are two versions of Bart Howard's "Fly Me to the Moon"; the closing anime theme was recorded at Abbey Road Studios and performed by Claire and Yoko Takahashi, respectively. The liner notes contain the lyrics for the two theme songs. A vinyl print of the album came out on September 9, 2015.

Neon Genesis Evangelion II
Neon Genesis Evangelion II is the second soundtrack album released for the Neon Genesis Evangelion anime series. It was produced by Hideaki Anno, while Shirō Sagisu composed the tracks (unless stated otherwise). The King Records label Starchild released the album with the catalog number KICA-290 on February 16, 1996, and the album peaked at number 4 on the Oricon albums chart where it stayed for 15 weeks. The album was re-released as a DVD-Audio with catalog number KIAW-22 on December 22, 2004.

Neon Genesis Evangelion III
Neon Genesis Evangelion III is a soundtrack album featuring music from the Neon Genesis Evangelion anime series. The album reached a peak of rank 1 on the Oricon album database, with 11 frequent appearances. Shirō Sagisu composed the music, the label Starchild distributed the album with Hideaki Anno as the producer. It was released on May 22, 1996 and on August 3, 2004 by Geneon Anime Music.

Neon Genesis Evangelion Addition
Neon Genesis Evangelion Addition is the fourth music album released relating to the Neon Genesis Evangelion franchise. It features three instrumental, five vocal, and four drama tracks. Addition was released on December 21, 1996 in Japan by King Records in a limited and a regular edition, which respectively bear the catalog numbers KICA-333 and KICA-334. The limited edition album was released to include a movie ticket for the first Evangelion movie, Evangelion: Death and Rebirth, which was released on March 15, 1997. The album cover features an illustration by Yoshiyuki Sadamoto, the series character designer.

Addition features the voice actresses for Rei Ayanami (Megumi Hayashibara), Asuka Langley Soryu (Yuko Miyamura), and Misato Katsuragi (Kotono Mitsuishi), who between them account for seven of the twelve tracks. The classical pieces of music in the album are "Chorus: Hallelujah" and "Chorus: Worthy is the Lamb...Amen" from "Messiah" by George Frideric Handel, played by the Amor Artis Chorale & English Chamber Orchestra and conducted by Johannes Somary, and "4th Mov: Presto" (Symphony No. 9 in D minor Op. 125 "Choral") ("Ode to Joy") by Ludwig van Beethoven, played by the Brussels Philharmonic and conducted by Alexander Rahbari.

Hayashibara, Miyamura, and Mitsuishi are accompanied by the voice actor for Shinji Ikari and the supporting characters on the drama track "Shuukyoku no Tsudzuki" ("After the End"), a comedic parody in which the reunited cast tries to come up with ways to continue Evangelion when popular demand makes the studio order them to produce a third season even though the TV series ended after a 26-episode run. Presented as a "lost 27th episode", the comedy revolves around the characters breaking the fourth wall, and behaving as if they are really actors who portray the characters on the series while at other times acting as if they are the characters in the series. They try to increase the sex appeal of the series, change the show's format, and try to explain what the Angels actually are. However, when their efforts prove "unsuccessful", they decide to give up on it. Humorous moments of the drama include Rei finally lashing out against Asuka's abuse, the Evangelion pilots being changed to resemble Super Sentai characters, Asuka and Kaworu interacting for the only time in the series, and the cast re-enacting the first episode solely by their own vocal sound effects.

Evangelion Death
Evangelion: Death is a soundtrack album released on June 11, 1997 by the King Records label Star Child, containing music from the first part of the first Evangelion film, Evangelion: Death and Rebirth. It reached a peak of rank 1 in the Oricon album database. Shirō Sagisu composed most of the music. The disc has several tuning tracks and string solos that are portrayed in the film as being played by the four primary Evangelion pilots. The disc includes as bonus tracks "False Regeneration" from the Rebith part of the film as well as Giuseppe Verdi's Requiem. The CD is no longer in print.

The End of Evangelion
The End of Evangelion is the soundtrack album of the 1997 film The End of Evangelion. It features music composed and conducted by Shirō Sagisu. It also features the ending theme as well as Johann Sebastian Bach's Air on the G String and Herz und Mund und Tat und Leben, BWV 147. It was released on September 26, 1997 on King Records's Starchild label, peaking at number 3 on Oricon's albums chart. Geneon Entertainment released the album on May 11, 2004 in North America.

Neon Genesis Evangelion: S² Works
Neon Genesis Evangelion: S² Works is a soundtrack box set of music from the anime television series Neon Genesis Evangelion and the first two Evangelion films, Evangelion: Death and Rebirth and The End of Evangelion. Released on December 4, 1998, it peaked at number 38 in the Oricon album chart, making 2 appearances in total. It was distributed by King Records and composed mostly by Shirō Sagisu. In addition to tracks included on earlier Evangelion soundtracks, this 7-disc set includes many unused songs and alternate mixes or arrangements of existing songs. It was issued as a limited edition release. The title is based on the fictional internal organ and infinite energy source of the Angels called the S² Engine.

Shin Godzilla vs Evangelion Symphony

Studio albums

Evangelion Classic 1 - Beethoven: Symphony No.9 "Choral"
 is a CD album containing a recording of Ludwig van Beethoven's Ninth Symphony, as conducted by Alexander Rahbari. The fourth movement was used in the 24th episode of the series, and was previously released on Neon Genesis Evangelion Addition. It was released on October 22, 1997 by King Records, with the catalog number KICC-231.
{{Track listing
|collapsed =yes
|headline = Track listing: Evangelion Classic 1 - Beethoven: Symphony No.9 "Choral"|total_length = 66:30
|title1  = 1st Movement: Allegro ma non troppo, un poco maestoso
|length1 = 15:56
|title2  = 2nd Movement: Molto vivace
|length2 = 17:14
|title3  = 3rd Movement: Adagio molto e cantabile
|length3 = 10:56
|title4  = 4th Movement: Presto
|length4 = 23:04
}}

Evangelion Classic 2 - Verdi: Requiem
 is a double-CD set containing a recording of Messa da Requiem by Giuseppe Verdi, as conducted by Alexander Rahbari. The "Dies irae" was used in the trailers for Evangelion: Death and Rebirth, and was previously released on Evangelion:Death. It was released on October 22, 1997 by King Records with the catalog number KICC-232.Track listing'''

Evangelion Classic 3 - George Frideric Händel: Messiah (Complete)
 is a soundtrack album released on October 22, 1997 by King Records. It features pieces originally composed by George Frideric Handel, as conducted by Johannes Somary. The Hallelujah chorus and the concluding piece, "CHORUS: Worthy is the Lamb...Amen" were used in the 22nd episode of the series, and were previously released on Neon Genesis Evangelion Addition. It was released as two CDs with the catalog number KICC-234 and peak ranked 96 in the Oricon charts, making only one appearance.

Evangelion Classic 4 - J.S. Bach: Orchestral Suite No.3 & others
 is a compilation CD album containing Johann Sebastian Bach's classical pieces used in Evangelion: Death & Rebirth and The End of Evangelion. It was released on October 22, 1997, produced by King Records with the catalog number KICC 236. The soundtrack was conducted by Vassil Kazandjiev and composed by Bach.

Refrain: The Songs Were Inspired by EvangelionRefrain: The Songs Were Inspired by Evangelion is an album consisting of songs from and based on the Neon Genesis Evangelion anime series. Some of the songs are new versions of tracks included on Neon Genesis Evangelion II, Neon Genesis Evangelion III and Evangelion: Death and Rebirth. All songs are performed by Yoko Takahashi (who performed the opening theme for the series as well as other tracks), track 14 being an exception which was recorded on the streets of London by street singers. This album was released by Starchild and produced by Toshiyuki Ohmori, it was released on November 6, 1997.

Evangelion Extreme
It was released under the King Record with catalog number KKICA-2561 on May 22, 2019. All songs are performed by Yoko Takahashi.

 Games 

Neon Genesis Evangelion: 2nd ImpressionNeon Genesis Evangelion: 2nd Impression'' is a 1997 video game for the Sega Saturn. It came with an extra mini-CD with four tracks, catalog number 670–10219.

Release details

Notes

References

External links
The Rose review

 
Anime soundtracks
Video game soundtracks